The 2002–03 United Counties League season was the 96th in the history of the United Counties League, a football competition in England.

Premier Division

The Premier Division featured 19 clubs which competed in the division last season, along with two new clubs, promoted from Division One:
Newport Pagnell Town
Woodford United

League table

Division One

Division One featured 15 clubs which competed in the division last season, along with one new club:
Bugbrooke St Michaels, relegated from the Premier Division

League table

References

External links
 United Counties League

2002–03 in English football leagues
United Counties League seasons